{{DISPLAYTITLE:C27H44O8}}
The molecular formula C27H44O8 (molar mass: 496.63 g/mol, exact mass: 496.3036 u) may refer to:

 Pregnanediol glucuronide
 Turkesterone